Daniel Krch (born 20 March 1992) is a professional Czech football defender playing for FK Dukla Prague in the Czech National Football League.

Club career

Bohemians 1905
Krch came to the first league on loan from AC Sparta Prague B to Bohemians 1905. He made his first league debut on 19 July 2013 in Bohemians's 5–0 away loss against FC Viktoria Plzeň. After the 2013/14 season, he transferred to Bohemians, and did not play for another club than Bohemians in the Czech First League. During the ten seasons he spent at Bohemians, he played 160 matches and became one of the legends of the club's modern history. He was also a captain for a while. In Autumn 2022, he joined the management of the club.

Dukla Prague
In January 2023, he transferred to Dukla Prague.

International career
He made several appearances for Czech Republic youth national teams, last for U19 team in 2010.

References

External links

Daniel Krch Official international statistics

1992 births
Living people
People from Tábor
Czech footballers
Czech Republic youth international footballers
Czech First League players
Czech National Football League players
AC Sparta Prague players
FC Silon Táborsko players
Bohemians 1905 players
FK Dukla Prague players
Association football defenders